Mickey's Twice Upon a Christmas is a 2004 American Christmas package film directed by Matthew O'Callaghan.  Segments of the anthology film were directed by Peggy Holmes, O'Callaghan, Theresa Cullen, and Carole Holliday. It was produced by Disneytoon Studios. The film is the computer-animated sequel to Mickey's Once Upon a Christmas (1999), and it features Mickey Mouse, Minnie Mouse, Pluto, Goofy, Max, Donald Duck, Daisy Duck, Huey, Dewey, and Louie and Scrooge McDuck in five different segments rather than three like its predecessor.

Plot
The narrator recites the first ten words of The Night Before Christmas before saying, "Oh, wait. Different story, but we'll still see a mouse!" The narrator then announces new tales of giving and loving, and a book opens to show pop-up elves.

Belles on Ice
The narrator said it all started on the first segment when Minnie Mouse and Daisy Duck were competing in an ice skating competition. The girls each are joined by their respective boyfriends, Mickey and Donald, as they prepare to take the ice. Daisy becomes envious of the crowd's reaction to Minnie and attempts to steal the spotlight for herself. Minnie performs several daredevil stunts to regain the spotlight while Daisy summons the Fantasia Hippos, who become her backup skaters while her counterpart summons the alligators from the 1940 film. Fed up, Daisy and Minnie argue and shove each other around, putting each other at risk, and then try pulling dramatic stunts to draw the attention of the crowds as Mickey and Donald watch with worry. When Minnie accidentally slips on a fallen handbell while landing from a stunt blindfolded, Daisy helps Minnie up while feeling sorry for her selfish actions. Minnie feels the same way, and they perform a grand finale; this time working together as a team.

Christmas: Impossible
The second segment tells the story of Huey, Dewey, and Louie celebrating Christmas Eve with Donald and Daisy Duck at Uncle Scrooge's mansion in Duckburg. After causing trouble at dinnertime, Scrooge warns them not to make the same mistakes he made when he was young. The boys know that they are on the naughty list for sure, so they travel to the North Pole to write their names on Santa's good list. At Santa's workshop, the trio cause more trouble by making a mess while trying to find the key to the room containing Santa's good list, but they and the elves help clean up to save Christmas. Before they leave, they luck into an opportunity to add their names to the good list; however, they add Scrooge's name instead, mindful of the fact that he was never written onto the list either. With their mission accomplished, they head home. On Christmas Day, they find a single gift for Scrooge, but Santa also leaves them a note that explains that their actions have caused them to also be put on the good list, and there are more presents behind the tree.

Christmas Maximus
The third segment's focus is about Max Goof and his father Goofy celebrating the holidays. A young adult Max brings home his girlfriend Mona to meet his father, Goofy. However, Max is unsure whether or not he wants Mona to meet his dad (Most of the story takes place within the song "Make Me Look Good"). Max at first is embarrassed by his dad, who labels his car as a limo, decorates the house with many Christmas lights, shows baby pictures to Mona, and wipes cocoa off Max's face. While wandering outside, he notices that his scarf is made by Goofy and realizes that Goofy is always, well, goofy, and that is why he loves him. Max then forgets about being embarrassed and decides to join in the fun when the popcorn making machine goes haywire. Max tries to stop the machine but has popcorn filling his clothes until he lets go. He becomes embarrassed after having his clothes inflate in front of Mona and flies across the room, but nevertheless enjoys it. Goofy tries to stop it next, but he is swung around in the air by the machine. Max, Goofy, and Mona are all pushed up by the popcorn through the chimney and onto the roof. Following this, Mona then reveals to have the same kind of teeth like Goofy and Max; they all laugh and make snow angels on the roof.

Donald's Gift
The fourth segment focuses on Donald Duck and his Christmas wish of peace and quiet. Daisy Duck and Huey, Dewey, and Louie also appear. As Donald returns home from grocery shopping, he daydreams and misses his bus. He runs to catch after it, but he is slowed down by a series of well-wishers that begin to sing "We Wish You a Merry Christmas". Donald becomes increasingly annoyed by the joyous people, and at home, he is annoyed to hear the same Christmas carols on his radio. When Daisy and his nephews arrive, Donald becomes annoyed that they want to go out so soon after he returned home and doesn't want to come, but Daisy drags him out anyway. At the mall, Donald grabs a cup of hot chocolate and discovers various objects seeming to play the same Christmas carol, causing him to be annoyed even more; Donald thinks he is in complete peace inside a secret room, where he finds animatronics singing. Donald immediately wrecks them until he notices he is destroying the show at Mousy's that Daisy, Huey, Dewey, and Louie, and also the crowd were trying to see; Dewey tricks Donald into being heartbroken by saying Donald is not their uncle anymore to avoid getting in trouble with the public. Daisy agrees to this and leaves with the boys. After he is thrown out of the mall by the mall guard for his lack of Christmas spirit and the destruction of the Mousy's show, Donald walks home alone while feeling guilty for his lack of Christmas spirit. He finds Christmas carolers having trouble with singing "We Wish You a Merry Christmas", to which he urges to mentor the performers in singing. When Daisy, Huey, Dewey, and Louie arrive, Donald apologizes to everyone for his selfishness and then joins the townspeople convened around a Christmas tree happily singing the song.

Mickey's Dog-Gone Christmas
The fifth and final segment stars Mickey as he makes decorations for the Christmas party, which his dog, Pluto keeps interrupting. When Pluto attempts to help by putting the star on the tree, he inadvertently destroys all the decorations, especially knocking down the Christmas tree, then a frustrated Mickey yells at Pluto and sends him to his doghouse as his punishment. Feeling like he is rejected by his owner, Pluto decides to run away from home and then finds himself shipped on a train to the North Pole, where Santa's reindeer adopt him and rename him "Murray". Back at home, Mickey redecorates the house and, feeling ashamed of how he lost his temper at Pluto, attempts to reconcile with him, only to find him missing with his collar laying on the floor of his doghouse. Mickey posts several "lost dog" posters and eventually turns to a department store Santa, who turns out to be the real one. Meanwhile, Pluto becomes homesick and begins to miss being with his owner to which Santa and the reindeer help Pluto return home. As Mickey's friends arrive on a snowplow which they used to help find Pluto, he completes the Christmas tree decorations and everyone celebrates Pluto's return, even Donald and Daisy Duck, who had just shown up with Huey, Dewey and Louie, Uncle Scrooge, Max, Goofy and Minnie Mouse (who is also entranced by the decorations). 

The film concludes with a medley of various carols featuring the main characters from the five segments as the book closes.

Cast
 Wayne Allwine as Mickey Mouse
 Tony Anselmo as Donald Duck
 Jeff Bennett as Donner, Elves and Janitor Elf
 Corey Burton as radio host
 Jim Cummings as Blitzen
 Bill Farmer as Goofy and Pluto
 Tress MacNeille as Daisy Duck and Female Elf
 Jason Marsden as Max Goof
 Kellie Martin as Mona
 Chuck McCann as Santa Claus
 Edie McClurg as Santa's Workshop Announcer
 Rob Paulsen as Elves and Crying Elf
 Clive Revill as the Narrator
 Fred Stoller as security guard
 Russi Taylor as Minnie Mouse, Huey, Dewey, and Louie
 April Winchell as Spectacular Announcer
 Alan Young as Scrooge McDuck

Release
The film was first released on DVD and VHS on November 9, 2004. Coinciding with its 10th anniversary, the film was released in a 2-Movie Collection Blu-ray and DVD with its predecessor Mickey's Once Upon a Christmas on November 4, 2014.

Reception
Joe Leydon of Variety wrote that the film will appeal mostly to parents who wish to distract their children, as children "will not realize the novelty value of computer-animated Disney characters".  Robert Pardi of TV Guide rated the film 3/5 stars and wrote, "A candy-cane palate and a festive soundtrack bolster this omnibus, which allows Disney favorites a chance to strut some new stuff."

See also
 List of Christmas films

Notes

References

External links

 
 

2004 films
2004 computer-animated films
2004 direct-to-video films
2000s Christmas comedy films
2000s fantasy comedy films
2000s children's comedy films
2000s American animated films
American anthology films
American children's animated comedy films
American children's animated fantasy films
American Christmas comedy films
American computer-animated films
American sequel films
Animated Christmas films
Direct-to-video sequel films
Disney direct-to-video animated films
Mickey Mouse films
Donald Duck films
Goofy (Disney) films
Films directed by Matthew O'Callaghan
Films directed by Peggy Holmes
Films scored by Stephen James Taylor
Films scored by Mark Watters
2004 comedy films
2000s children's animated films
Scrooge McDuck
Films with screenplays by Peggy Holmes
Films with screenplays by Matthew O'Callaghan
2000s English-language films